Listerhill is an unincorporated community in Colbert County, in the U.S. state of Alabama.

Listerhill contains a large aluminum plant.  The community was named in honor of J. Lister Hill, a United States Senator from Alabama who was instrumental in the construction of the plant.

References

Unincorporated communities in Colbert County, Alabama
Unincorporated communities in Alabama